No man's land is an unoccupied area between two opposing positions.

No man's land (Latrun) is an example.

No Man's Land, No-man's land or Nomansland may also refer to:

Places

United Kingdom 
 No Man's Land, Cornwall, England
 No Man's Land Fort, off the coast of the Isle of Wight, England
 Nomansland, Devon, England
 Nomansland, Hertfordshire, England
 Nomansland, Wiltshire, England

United States 
 No Man's Land, Illinois
 No Man's Land (Louisiana) or Neutral Ground
 No Man's Land (Oklahoma) or Oklahoma Panhandle
 Nomans Land (Massachusetts)
 No Man's Land Navy Airfield
 Nomans Land Range
Nomans Land Island National Wildlife Refuge

Film 
 No Man's Land (1918 film), an American silent drama film by Will S. Davis
 No Man's Land (1931 film) or Hell on Earth, a German film
 No Man's Land (1939 film), an Italian drama film
 No Man's Land (1962 film), a film starring Roger Moore
 No Man's Land (1964 film), a war film
 No Man's Land (1984 film), an American television film by Rod Holcomb 
 No Man's Land (1985 film), a French-language film by Alain Tanner
 No Man's Land (1987 film), an American film by Peter Werner
 No Man's Land (2001 film), a Bosnian-language film by Danis Tanović
 No Man's Land: The Rise of Reeker, a 2008 American film by Dave Payne
 No Man's Land (2013 film), a Chinese film by Ning Hao
 No Man's Land (2021 film), an American film starring Andie MacDowell

Literature
 No Man's Land (play), a play by Harold Pinter
 No Man's Land (Baldacci novel), a novel by David Baldacci
 No Man's Land (Greene novel), a 1950 novel by Graham Greene
 No Man's Land: An Investigative Journey Through Kenya and Tanzania, a 1994 book by George Monbiot
 No Man's Land (manga), an English-language manga series
 Batman: No Man's Land, a 1999–2000 Batman comic book crossover storyline
 No Man's Land (short story collection), a 1917 short-story collection by H. C. McNeile
 Nomansland, a 1993 novel by David G. Compton
 No Man's Land, a hip-hop theater play by Marc Bamuthi Joseph
 No Man's Land, a novel by Simon Tolkien

Television
 "No Man's Land" (CSI: Miami)
 "No Man's Land" (Gotham)
 "No Man's Land" (Grey's Anatomy)
 "No Man's Land" (Stargate Atlantis)
 No Man's Land (audio drama), a 2006 audio drama based on Doctor Who

Music
 No Man's Land (record label),  a German record label based in Würzburg, Germany

Albums
 No Man's Land (Jacques Higelin album) (1978)
 No Man's Land (Lene Lovich album) (1982)
 No Man's Land (Souls of Mischief album) (1995)
 No Man's Land (Frank Turner album) (2019)
 No Man's Land, a 1985 album by Terry Riley
 No mans land, a 2011 album by Milk Inc.

Songs
 "No Man's Land" (Eric Bogle song) (1976)
 "No Man's Land" (Billy Joel song) (1993)
 "No Man's Land" (Beverley Knight song) (2007)
 "No Man's Land" (Koda Kumi song) (2012)
 "No Man's Land" (John Michael Montgomery song) (1995)
 "No Man's Land" (Midnight Oil song) (2003)
"No Man's Land", by Stela Cole from "Woman of the Hour"
"No Man's Land", by Bella Poarch featuring Grimes from "Dolls EP"
 "No Man's Land", by Syd Barrett from The Madcap Laughs
 "No Man's Land", by Alice Cooper from DaDa
 "No Man's Land", by Download from Furnace
 "No Mans Land", by Mike Oldfield from Tr3s Lunas
 "No Man's Land", by OMD from English Electric
 "No Man's Land", by Panda Bear from Crosswords
 "No Man's Land", by Bob Seger from Against the Wind
 "No Man's Land", by Soul Asylum from While You Were Out
 "No Man's Land", by Sufjan Stevens from The Avalanche
 "No Man's Land", an instrumental composition by Tangerine Dream from Hyperborea
 "No Man's Land", by AC/DC from their 2020 album Power Up (AC/DC album)

Sport
 No man's land, a strategically vulnerable area on a pickleball court
 No-man's land, a strategically vulnerable area on a tennis court

Other uses
 No Man's Land, a sculpture by Charles Sargeant Jagger
 No Man's Land (video game), a 2003 video game

See also
 

 Niemandsland and Beyond, a 1990 album by Koos Kombuis
 Terra nullius (English: Nobody's land), land not claimed by any sovereign state
 Tierra de Nadie (disambiguation), (Spanish for "No Mans Land")